The Bosavi woolly rat is an undescribed putative species of rodent that was discovered deep in the jungle of Papua New Guinea in 2009. It is believed to belong to the genus Mallomys, within the family Muridae, according to initial investigation, although this has yet to be published. The name Bosavi woolly rat is still provisional and a scientific name has yet to be given.

A captured specimen showed no fear of humans.

See also
 Rodents discovered in the 2000s

References

Rodents of New Guinea
Mallomys
Rodents of Papua New Guinea
Undescribed vertebrate species